The Thanjavur Nayak kingdom or Thanjavur Nayak dynasty were the rulers of Thanjavur in the 15th and 17th centuries. The Nayaks of the  Balija social group, were originally appointed as provincial governors by the Vijayanagara Emperor in the 15th century, who divided the territory into Nayak kingdoms which were Madurai, Tanjore, Gingee and Kalahasthi. In the mid 15th century they became an independent kingdom, although they continued their alliance with the Vijayanagara Empire. The Thanjavur Nayaks were notable for their patronage of literature and the arts.

A translation from Raghunathabhyudayam (p. 284), says this about Timma Nayak the father of Sevappa Nayak, the founder of the Tanjore Nayak in line: In the sathria caste born from the feet of Vishnu was born a king called Timma Nayak. The Mannaru (Vishnu) of the Mannargudi temple was their kula daivam (family deity).

Origins of Nayak rule
With the demise of the Chola dynasty in 1279, Thanjavur was ruled by a branch of Chola dynasty, until the Vijayanagara Empire conquered all of South India by the late 14th century. The Vijayanagar rulers  to rule over various parts of the empire. In 1532 CE, Achyuta Deva Raya, the brother and successor of Krishna Deva Raya of Vijayanagar granted Sevappa Nayak, the governor of Thanjavur, permission to establish a feudatory kingdom.

Literature

Tamil and Telugu literature flourished during the reign of Nayakas in Tanjavur which was referred to as the Southern School of Tamil and Telugu Literature. Many Tamil and Telugu Musicians and Pandits were part of their court.

Nayak kings

Chevvappa Nayak

Chevvappa Nayak (1532–1580), also known as Sevappa Nayak, was the first Thanjavur Nayak king.  He was the son of Timmappa Nayak, a Vijayanagara viceroy in the Arcot region from his wife Bayyambika. The work Raghunathabhyudayam written by Vijayaraghava Nayaka gives some genealogical details of Timmappa. Timmappa or Timmabhupati was the ruler of North Arcot with his capital at Nedungunram. The epigraphs of all of the Tanjore Nayaks show that they belonged to Nedungunram. One of Krishnadevaraya's epigraphs mentions that Timmappa also had the high privilege of serving him as a door keeper (vasal) and was the emperor's dalavay (commander) who took part in the Raichur campaign. According to historian V. Vriddhagirisan, Timmappa Nayak was the brother of Nagama Nayak. Nagama Nayak was the father of Visvanatha Nayak (founder of the Madurai Nayak dynastic line). Hence Viswanatha Nayak and Chevvappa Nayak were cousin

Before assuming power of the Tanjore kingdom, Sevvappa had distinguished himself under Krishnadavaraya as an administrator and a builder. Sevappa's wife Murtimamba was the sister-in-law of Achyuta Deva Raya and the sister of the Vijayanagara Queen, Thirumalamba. Some sources suggest that Sevappa acquired the Thanjavur Kingdom as Stridhana  from Achyutadeva Raya. Sevappa was also a ceremonial betel bearer to Achyuta Deva Raya, the brother of Krishnadevaraya.

According to the book Arunachala: A short history of hill and temple in Tiruvannamalai (pg 54–55), the "position of a ceremonial betel bearer or adaiappan (thambul karandivan) was a post given to a very trusted subordinate.. and Sevappa being a powerful and influential man of the locality was appointed the first nayak". The position of a betel bearer was usually not given to an outsider, as this position would make the man privy to all of the king's personal details. Therefore, the position was usually given to a trusted member within the family.

His contributions include building the prakaras at Vridhachalam and Kanchipuram, gilding with gold the Vimanas of Srisailam and Thirumala (Tirupati), construction of the tallest gopura at Tiruvannamalai, and repairing the Sivaganga Fort and Tank at Tanjore.

Achuthappa Nayak
Sevappa's son, Achuthappa Nayak (1560–1614), was named in memory of Achyuta Deva Raya. He led a peaceful reign of 54 years. Up until 1580 Achuthappa Nayak co-ruled with his father under the Yuvaraja title while immediately after that he was joined by his heir, son Raghunatha Nayak. He was said to be deeply religious and was well considered a master in the art of warfare. His minister was Govinda Dikshitar, a great scholar and a shrewd administrator. His long reign was of comparative peace apart from the internal struggles enabling him to contribute much to spiritual and public utility development.

Conflicts and wars

Wars with Madurai 
During the reign of Achuthappa, the Vijayanagara Empire was defeated by the Deccan sultanates armies at the battle of Talikota. Later when the Vijaynagara rulers re-established their capital in Chandragiri and Vellore under Sriranga Rayas, Achuthappa Nayak continued his loyalty while Gingee and Madurai Nayaks intended to break free by refusing to pay tribute. This would also lead to bitter animosity between the Madurai Nayaks and the Tanjore Nayaks ultimately leading to the Battle at Vallamprakara where the Tanjore army with the Rayas fought against Veerappa Nayak of Madurai by defeating the latter. This happened at the same time as when the Rayas of Chandragiri were waging wars with the Deccan Sultanates in southern Andhra Pradesh, Achuthappa Nayak provided support.

Wars with Portugal 
Portugal controlled the Nagapattinam territory as well as the Colombo province in Ceylon and the entire West Coast of India. The King of Jaffna kingdom went into a war against Portugal against the methods adopted by the missionary conversions in Jaffna. Later King of Jaffna sought help from the Tanjore Nayaks in repelling Portuguese advances through many battles

Public contributions
Achuthappa Nayak was deeply religious from his young days and the fertile nature of his country helped him make large contributions in gifts and infrastructure to major Temples and also important irrigation systems. The main benefactor was the Srirangam Temple. His assistant and advisor was his minister Govinda Dikshita.

Srirangam Temple

The Srirangam Temple towers (Gopurams) of the North and West and the eighth Prakara (temple Wall Street) and several Halls (Mandapam) inside the Temple complex were built by him. The Golden Vimana of the inner most shrines (Temple Flag) and the image of God studded with Crown jewels was presented by Achuthappa Nayak.

Other Temples
His other major contributions include the Pushyamantapas (Halls) with steps leading to river Cauvery in Mayavaram, Tiruvidaimarudur, Tiruvadi and Kumbakonam and Golden Kalasas of Tiruvannamalai Temple Gopurams (Towers) some of the Gopurams in Rameswaram. Several temples in Arcot and Tanjore regions namely Temples in Tiruvidaimarudur and Chidambaram received villages as grants.

Irrigation
His one remarkable contribution is the construction of a dam across Cauvery near Tiruvadi leading to efficient irrigation in its vicinity.

Housing

Numerous Agraharas (housing for Brahmins) in Tanjore country were built in his period.

Final years
During his last days the Rayas now ruling from Chandragiri and Vellore had rival claimants within the family to the title and were heading for a war with the other Nayak kings taking sides with some suited to their vested interests.

Raghunatha Nayak
Raghunatha Nayak (1600–1634) He is the Most Powerful King of Nayaks of Tanjore. He is famous for his patronage of literature other scholarly research. One of his wives, Ramabhadramba was highly educated and a gifted poet. During his time he granted military assistance to the Chandragiri ruler Venkata II to recover most of his lost areas from the Golconda forces. In 1620 Raghunatha Nayak permitted a Danish settlement at Tarangambadi.  This encouraged the English to seek trade with the Thanjavur Nayaks. The Tanjore cannon or Raghunatha cannon, supposed to be the largest cannon in the world was installed during Raghunatha Nayak, built with Danish metallurgy know how.

Raghunatha was a gifted scholar in Sanskrit, Kannada and Telugu languages, as well as a talented musician. His court was distinguished for its assembly of poets and scholars. Ragunatha is credited with writing several books on music and literature. Maduravani and Ramabhadramba were two famous poets in his court, while Sudhindra and Raghavendra were two famous Madhva gurus patronised by him. Govinda Dikshita's son Yajnanarayana has written an account on Raghunatha's rule in his work Sahitya Ratnakara. Raghunatha was a gifted scholar and an expert in the art of swordplay, a fine marksman and a skilled master in horse riding. In the field of music, Raghunatha created new ragas, talas, and melas like Jayanta sena (Ragam), Ramananda (Talam), Sargita vidya and Raghunatha (Mela). His Sanskrit treatise on music, Sangita Sudha opened the secrets of music to all. Raghunatha also composed kavyas and dance-dramas like Prabandkas, Parijatapaharana, Valmika Charitra Kavya, Achyutendrabhyudayam, Gajendramoksham, Nala Caritiam and Rukmini Krishna Vivaha Yakshagana.

It was during Raghunatha's reign that a palace library was established.  Sarasvati Bhandar is where the manuscripts of Raghunatha's prolific court scholars were collected and preserved. This library was developed and enriched later by Rajah Serfoji II into the currently famous Saraswati Mahal Library.

Civil war in Vellore
During Raghunatha's rule, a civil war involving succession to the throne was taking place in the Vijayanagara Kingdom, now based in Vellore and Chandragiri.  Gobburi Jagga Raya, brother of the previous ruler Venkata II's favourite Queen Obayamma claimed her putative son as the King and murdered Sriranga II along with his family in the Vellore Prison. Jagga Raya was strongly challenged by Yachamanedu, the chief of Kalahasti who claimed the throne for Rama Deva, the rightful heir whom he had smuggled out from the Vellore Prison. Jagga Raya sought help from the Gingee Nayak and Muttu Virappa of Madurai to attack Yachamanedu and Rama Deva.  Yachamanedu and Ramadeva sought support from Raghunatha, who still treated the Vijaynagar as his authority.

The Battle of Toppur 

Jagga Raya assembled a large army near Tiruchirappalli, the capital of Muttu Virappa comprising the armies of Gingee, Chera, Madurai, and some Portuguese from the coast. Yachama led the forces of Vijayanagara and Kalahasti from Vellore and was joined midway by Tanjore forces headed by Raghunatha.Yachama's army was further strengthened by  nobles from Karnataka and (according to some accounts) Dutch and Jaffna armies.

Both the Armies met at the Toppur, at an open field on the northern banks of River Cauvery, between Tiruchirappalli and Grand Anicut in late months of 1616.  The huge assembly of forces on either side is estimated to be as many as a million soldiers (according to Dr. Barradas in Sewell's Book) and considered to be one of the biggest battles in southern India.

Result 
In the Battle Jagga Raya's troops could not withstand the aggression generated by the imperial forces.  Yachama and Raghunatha, the generals of the imperial camp led their forces with great discipline.  Jagga Raya was slain by Yachama, and his army broke the ranks and took flight.  Yethiraja, the brother of Jagga Raya, had to run for his life.  Muttu Virappa tried to escape, he was pursued by Yachama's general Rao Dama Nayani who captured him near Tiruchirapalli.  The Nayak of Gingee in the war lost all his forts except Gingee Fort and the putative son of Venkata II, cause of all trouble was captured.  The Victory was celebrated by the imperial armies headed by Raghunatha and Yachamanedu, who planted pillars of Victory and crowned Rama Deva as Rama Deva Raya, in early months of 1617.  Rama Deva Raya was barely 15 years old when he ascended the throne.

Vijaya Raghava Nayak
Vijaya Raghava Nayak (1634–1673), was the last of the Nayak Kings of Thanjavur.  He was also called Mannaru Dasa; and like the rest of his family, he built prakaras, gopurams, mandapams and tanks in the Mannargudi Rajagopalaswamy temple. Vijayaraghava's long reign witnessed a large amount of literary output both in music and Telugu literature. Vijayaraghava's court had a number of poets and literary scholars. Vijayaraghava Nayak wrote more than thirty books in Telugu. His long reign was sadly brought to an abrupt end by Chokkanatha Nayak of Madurai.

End of Nayak rule

The end of the Thanjavur Nayak dynasty was brought on by Chokkanatha Nayak, the Nayak of Madurai.  The dispute was due to the refusal of Vijaya Ragava Nayak to give his daughter in marriage to Chokkanatha Nayak.  Chokkantha determined to fetch the maiden by force back into their capital, successfully stormed the Thanjavur palace in 1673 after flattening much of the fort walls by cannons.  But Chokkanatha Nayak was thwarted in his attempts by Vijaya Ragava Nayak, when  he, in a gruesome act of defiance, blew up his daughter and all the other ladies of the palace.  He then charged at the attacking army with his son and his body-guard. He was captured after a brief fight, and was beheaded by the Madurai General Samukham Venkata Krishnappa Nayak.

Maratha conquest
Chokkanatha placed his younger brother Alagiri Nayak on the throne of Thanjavur, but within a year the latter threw off his allegiance, and Chokkanatha was forced to recognise the independence of Thanjavur. Chengamala Das, the son of Vijaya Raghava induced the Bijapur Sultan to help him get back the Thanjavur throne. In 1675, the Sultan of Bijapur sent a force commanded by the Maratha general Venkoji (alias Ekoji) to drive away the Madurai usurper. Venkaji defeated Alagiri with ease, and occupied Thanjavur. He did not, however, place his protege on the throne, but seized the kingdom and made himself king due to the disintegration of the Bijapur state. Thus ended the reign of Nayaks and the start of Maratha power in Thanjavur.

See also
 Madurai Nayak dynasty
 Nayaks of Gingee

References

Bibliography
 Nagaswamy, R Tamil Coins- a study, (1970), State Department of Archaeology, Government of Tamil Nadu
 Vriddhagirisan V, Nayaks of Tanjore, Reprint Annamalainagar 1942 edn., 1995
 Velcheru Narayana Rao|Rao, David Shulman and Sanjay Subrahmanyam. Symbols of substance : court and state in Nayaka period Tamil Nadu (Delhi ; Oxford : Oxford University Press, 1998) ; xix, 349 p., [16] p. of plates : ill., maps ; 22 cm. ; Oxford India paperbacks ; Includes bibliographical references and index ; .
 Sathianathaier, R. History of the Nayaks of Madura [microform] by R. Sathyanatha Aiyar ; edited for the university, with introduction and notes by S. Krishnaswami Aiyangar ([Madras] : Oxford University Press, 1924) ; see also ([London] : H. Milford, Oxford university press, 1924) ; xvi, 403 p. ; 21 cm. ; SAMP early 20th-century Indian books project item 10819.
The Political Career of E.V. Ramasami Naicker: A Study in the Politics page 79 by I. Vicuvanatan, E. S. Visswanathan
The Mysore Tribes and Castes by L Anantha Krishna Iyer and H.V Nanjundayya
Encyclomedia Indica by Jagadish Saran Sharma
Gazetteer of the Nellore District: Madras District Gazettees - Page 105, Government Of Madras Staff - History - 2004 - 384 pages
Questioning Ramayana: A South Asian Tradition by Paula Richman
Literary Cultures in History by Sheldon Pollock
Castes and Tribes of Southern India by Edgar Thurston and Rangachari
Caste and Race in India by G.S.Ghurye
[ Questioning Ramayanas - by Paula Richman]
[ The Literary Cultures in History - by Sheldon I Pollock]
[ Further Sources of Vijayanagara History By K A Nilakanta Sastry]
[ Penumbral Visions - by Sanjay Subrahmanyam]
[]
 "Thanjavur -  A Cultural History", Pradeep chakravarthy, Niyogi books

External links
 
 
 
 

States and territories established in 1572
Dynasties of India
Tamil Nadu under the Vijayanagar Empire
Telugu people
Hindu monarchs
Telugu monarchs
History of Thanjavur
1532 in India